The "-P Convention" or "P Question" refers to the act of making a statement into a question by appending "P." When spoken aloud, the "P" is literally pronounced as a separate syllable "Pee."

This practice originated among users of the Lisp programming language, in which there is
the convention of appending the letter "P" on elements to denote a predicate (a yes or no question). It is most commonly used at MIT and the University of California, Berkeley, or among computer scientists working in Artificial intelligence (which frequently uses Lisp).

This usage was immortalized in the Jargon File and from there the use spread to some younger users seeking to be part of the classical Internet community.

The typical example of use is:
    Q: "Foodp?" (Do you want food?)
    A: "T!" (Literally, True: yes)
    A: "Nil." (Also Null; no, I don't want food).

See also 
M-expression and S-expression were other new information representations introduced in a related context.

External links
 http://catb.org/jargon/html/p-convention.html

Computer jargon